August Jakobson (2 September 1904 – 23 May 1963) was an Estonian writer and politician. He was one of the few Estonian playwright among his contemporaries whose plays were untouched by Soviet censorship and reached other Soviet states. He has been described as the leading Stalinist in Soviet Estonian drama. In the 1960s his work was described as "ideologically militant".

Born Augustin Jakobson in Pärnu, he was the son of Mihkel Jakobson and Maria Jakobson (née Moritson). Jakobson graduated from school in 1926 in Pärnu, then studied economics at the University of Tartu from 1926 to 1929 and medicine from 1931 to 1935. However, he left school without acquiring a formal degree. His debut novel, Vaeste-patuste alev (1927), won the first place award in a literary competition sponsored by the publishing house Loodus.

He was the head of the Estonian Writers' Union in 1939–1940 and in 1944–1946 (then known as Writers' Union of the Estonian SSR).

From August 1940, Jakobson was a member of a Soviet censorship committee. From 1950 to 1958 he was the head of the Presidium of the Supreme Soviet of the Estonian Soviet Socialist Republic.
Near the Endla Theatre in Pärnu stands a monument for Jakobson.

Bibliography
 Vaeste-patuste alev (1927) (novel)
 "Elu tsitadellis" (1946) (play)
 "Võitlus rindejooneta" (1947) (play)

See also
 List of Chairmen of the Presidium of the Supreme Soviet of the Estonian Soviet Socialist Republic

References

 "Eesti kirjanduse ajalugu" part V, book 1. Eesti Raamat, 1987. pp. 162–172.

1904 births
1963 deaths
People from Pärnu
People from Kreis Pernau
Members of the Central Committee of the Communist Party of Estonia
Heads of state of the Estonian Soviet Socialist Republic
Members of the Supreme Soviet of the Estonian Soviet Socialist Republic, 1947–1951
Members of the Supreme Soviet of the Estonian Soviet Socialist Republic, 1951–1955
First convocation members of the Soviet of Nationalities
Third convocation members of the Soviet of Nationalities
Fourth convocation members of the Soviet of Nationalities
Estonian male novelists
20th-century Estonian novelists
Estonian dramatists and playwrights
People's Writers of the Estonian SSR
Stalin Prize winners
Recipients of the Order of Lenin
Burials at Metsakalmistu
Soviet novelists